The Uttarakhand Metro is a light rapid transit system proposed for the city of Dehradun, India. The proposal of the metro rail corridor from the Nepali Farm to the Vidhan Sabha in Dehradun district was approved. The Unified Metropolitan Transport Authority (UMTA) approved 73 km long DeharadunHaridwarRishikesh Metro Rail corridor in Uttarakhand in June 2020. The estimated cost of the project would be  40,150 crore. The decision was taken by the Chief Minister of Uttarakhand Trivendra Singh Rawat who had chaired the meeting of UMTA.

Network 
The metro rail corridor from the Nepali Farm to the Vidhan Sabha in Dehradun, a 10 km long metro track will be constructed in Dehradun City.

The Dehradun–Haridwar–Rishikesh Metro corridor will be 73 km long.

See also 
 Char Dham Railway
 Rishikesh–Karnaprayag Railway
 Urban rail transit in India
 Kolkata Metro
 Delhi Metro

References

External links 

 Uttarakhand Metro Rail Corporation

Proposed transport infrastructure in India
Transport in Dehradun